Buchanan County is a United States county in far western Virginia, the only county in the state to border both West Virginia and Kentucky.  The county is part of the Southwest Virginia region and lies in the rugged Appalachian Plateau portion of the Appalachian Mountains. Its county seat is Grundy.

Buchanan County was established in 1858 from parts of Russell and Tazewell counties, and it was named in honor of then-President James Buchanan. Local pronunciation differs from that of the 15th president's surname; here the county is pronounced as 
"Búh-can-nin".  In 1880, part of Buchanan County was taken to form Dickenson County.

As of the 2020 census, the county population was 20,355. Its population has decreased by double digits over the last forty years. As of 2012, Buchanan was the fifth-poorest county in Virginia, when ranked by median household income; it has consistently been in the bottom 5% over the past decade.

History 

The county was formed in 1858 from parts of Russell and Tazewell counties. It was named for James Buchanan, the 15th President of the United States. In 1876, Grundy was chosen and designated by the legislature as the county seat of Buchanan County, it was named in honor of Felix Grundy, a United States Senator from Tennessee.

In 1880, the southwestern part of Buchanan County was combined with parts of Russell and Wise counties to become Dickenson County.

Helen Timmons Henderson (1877–1925) participated in the work of the Buchanan Mission School at Council, Virginia. She and Sarah Lee Fain (1888–1962) of Norfolk were the first two women to be elected to the Virginia General Assembly. They were both Democrats in the House of Delegates. What is now Route 80 is also known as "Helen Henderson Highway".

Geography
Outdoor recreation is provided by Poplar Gap Park near Grundy and William P. Harris Park located in Council.

Districts 
The county is divided into seven supervisor districts: Garden, Hurricane, Knox, North Grundy, Prater, Rock Lick, and South Grundy.

Adjacent counties
 Mingo County, West Virginia – north
 McDowell County, West Virginia – east
 Tazewell County, Virginia – southeast
 Russell County, Virginia – south
 Dickenson County, Virginia – southwest
 Pike County, Kentucky – northwest

Major highways

Demographics

2020 census

Note: the US Census treats Hispanic/Latino as an ethnic category. This table excludes Latinos from the racial categories and assigns them to a separate category. Hispanics/Latinos can be of any race.

2000 Census

As of the census of 2000, there were 26,978 people, 10,464 households, and 7,900 families residing in the county.  The population density was 54 people per square mile (21/km2).  There were 11,887 housing units at an average density of 24 per square mile (9/km2).  The racial makeup of the county was 96.75% White, 2.62% Black or African American, 0.06% Native American, 0.14% Asian, 0.10% from other races, 0.33% from two or more races, and 0.47% of the population were Hispanic or Latino of any race.

There were 10,464 households, out of which 30.60% had children under the age of 18 living with them, 60.90% were married couples living together, 10.60% had a female householder with no husband present, and 24.50% were non-families.  Of all households, 22.50% were made up of individuals, and 9.40% had someone living alone who was 65 years of age or older.  The average household size was 2.46 and the average family size was 2.87.

In the county, the population was spread out, with 21.40% under the age of 18, 8.50% from 18 to 24, 31.20% from 25 to 44, 27.50% from 45 to 64, and 11.50% who were 65 years of age or older.  The median age was 39 years. For every 100 females there were 102.90 males.  For every 100 females age 18 and over, there were 102.30 males.

The median income for a household in the county was $22,213, and the median income for a family was $27,328. Males had a median income of $29,540 versus $17,766 for females. The per capita income for the county was $12,788.  About 19.80% of families and 23.20% of the population were below the poverty line, including 30.20% of those under age 18 and 16.90% of those age 65 or over.

Government

Board of Supervisors
 Garden District: Jeff Cooper
 Hurricane District: Tim Hess
 Knox District: Trey Adkins (D)
 North Grundy District: James Carroll Branham (D)
 Prater District: Drew Keene (Chairman)
 Rock Lick District: Craig Stiltner (R)
 South Grundy District: Gary Roger Rife (R)

Constitutional officers
 Clerk of the Circuit Court: Beverly S. Tiller (D)
 Commissioner of the Revenue: A. Ruth Horn (R)
 Commonwealth's Attorney: Gerald D. Arrington (D)
 Sheriff: John C. McClanahan (R)
 Treasurer: Keith Boyd

Buchanan County is represented by Republican Travis Hackworth in the Virginia Senate, Republican James W. "Will" Morefield in the Virginia House of Delegates, and Republican Morgan Griffith in the U.S. House of Representatives.

Buchanan County, a classically ancestral Democratic county, has become a Republican stronghold at the presidential level, in common with much of Appalachia.

Education

Colleges 
 Appalachian School of Law, Grundy
 Appalachian College of Pharmacy, Oakwood

Private schools 
 Mountain Mission School, Grundy
 Keen Mountain Christian Academy, Oakwood

Public high schools 
All public schools in Buchanan County are operated by Buchanan County Public Schools system.
 Grundy Senior High School, Grundy
 Twin Valley High School, Pilgrims Knob
 Council High School, Council
 Hurley High School, Hurley

Public elementary and middle schools 
 Twin Valley Elem/Middle School
 Council Elementary School
 Riverview Elementary Middle School
 Hurley Elementary/Middle School

Former schools 
 Harman Elementary (Demolished: 2009; site is now a baseball field.)
 Vansant Elementary (Demolished: 2007)
 Big Rock Elementary (Demolished: 2009)
 Grundy Jr. High School (Now the Appalachian School of Law)
 Garden Elementary (Demolished)
 Garden Middle School
 Garden High School (Now the Appalachian College of Pharmacy)
 Jewell Valley Elementary School (Demolished: ?) 
 J.M. Bevins Elementary School (Closed: 2018)
 Whitewood Elementary School (Demolished)
 Whitewood High School (Demolished: 2010)
 D.A. Justus (Demolished)
 P.V. Dennis (Now the ASL Library)
 Russell Prater Elementary (Closed: 2014)

Communities

Towns
 Grundy

Census-designated place
 Vansant

Other unincorporated communities

 Big Rock
 Council
 Davenport
 Harman
 Harman Junction
 Hurley
 Keen Mountain
 Mavisdale
 Maxie
 Oakwood
 Prater
 Shortt Gap
 Stacy
 Royal City
 Rowe
 Whitewood

See also
 National Register of Historic Places listings in Buchanan County, Virginia
 The Virginia Mountaineer

References

Further reading
Sutherland, Elihu Jasper. Some Sandy Basin Characters. Self-published by Elihu Jasper Sutherland: Clintwood, Virginia, 1962. 

 
Virginia counties
1858 establishments in Virginia
Counties of Appalachia
Populated places established in 1858